Kirill Sviyazov (born October 23, 1992) is a Russian professional ice hockey defenceman. He is currently playing with Izhstal Izhevsk in the Supreme Hockey League (VHL) on loan from Severstal Cherepovets of the Kontinental Hockey League (KHL).

Sviyazov made his Kontinental Hockey League debut playing with Severstal Cherepovets during the 2012–13 KHL season.

References

External links

1992 births
Living people
HC Lada Togliatti players
Russian ice hockey defencemen
Severstal Cherepovets players